Bloor Homes is an English housebuilder based in Measham, Leicestershire.

History
The company was founded by John Bloor in 1969. In 2002, housing sales reached 1,870 making Bloor Homes then the largest housebuilder to be owned by one person. As of 2016, Bloor Homes is now one of the largest privately owned housebuilding groups in the UK. The combined group is worth around £725 million.

Operations
As of 2012, Bloor Homes builds circa 1,800 homes a year. In 2015, this increased to a rate of 2,000 a year thanks to the upturn in the UK economy.

References

External links
Official Website

Housebuilding companies of the United Kingdom
Construction and civil engineering companies of England
Construction and civil engineering companies established in 1969
1969 establishments in England
British companies established in 1969